Austin Krajicek was the defending champion, but chose to compete in the Japan Open instead of defending his title.

Paolo Lorenzi won the title defeating Gonzalo Lama in the final, 7–6(7–3), 2–0 retired.

Seeds

Draw

Finals

Top half

Bottom half

References
 Main Draw
 Qualifying Draw

Seguros Bolivar Open Medellin - Singles
2015 Singles